Perafensine (INN) (code name HR-459) is a drug which was investigated as an antidepressant but was never marketed. It has been reported to antagonize the effects of reserpine and to inhibit the reuptake of norepinephrine (norepinephrine reuptake inhibitor); whether it also affects the reuptake of serotonin or dopamine is unclear.

See also 
 Diclofensine
 Nomifensine

References 

Abandoned drugs
Antidepressants
Isoquinolines
Norepinephrine reuptake inhibitors
Piperazines